Darrell William Opfer (born June 17, 1941) is a former member of the Ohio House of Representatives. He was elected to the Ohio House of Representatives in 1992 and retired in 1999.

References

Democratic Party members of the Ohio House of Representatives
Peace Corps volunteers
Living people
People from Genoa, Ohio
1941 births